The 2015 European Table Tennis Championships were held in Yekaterinburg, Russia from 25 September to 4 October 2015. Venue for the competition is Yekaterinburg-Expo.

Medal summary

Men's events

Women's events

Medal table

References
 

2015
European Championships
International sports competitions hosted by Russia
Table Tennis European Championships
October 2015 sports events in Russia
Table tennis competitions in Russia
Sport in Yekaterinburg